Wang Peng (born 16 November 1997) is a Chinese footballer who currently plays for Guangzhou R&F in the Chinese Super League. He is the son of Chinese former international Wang Huiliang.

Club career
Wang Peng started his professional football career with Portuguese club Gondomar. On 30 September 2017, he scored his first goal for the club in a 1–1 draw against Felgueiras 1932.

In July 2018, Wang was loaned to Chinese Super League side Guangzhou R&F. On 18 August 2018, he made his debut for the club in a 5–2 home win over Changchun Yatai, coming on as a substitute for Zhang Jiajie in the 89th minute.

Career statistics
.

References

External links
 

1997 births
Living people
Association football midfielders
Chinese footballers
China youth international footballers
Hakka sportspeople
Footballers from Guangzhou
Guangzhou City F.C. players
Gondomar S.C. players
Chinese Super League players
Chinese expatriate footballers
Expatriate footballers in Portugal
Chinese expatriate sportspeople in Portugal